Michelle Hartman may refer to:

 Michelle Hartman (poet) (born 1956), American author and poet
 Michelle Hartman (translator), Canadian academic and translator